Selma Unified School District is a school system located in Selma, California. It consists of eleven schools, one high school, one middle school, eight elementary schools, and one continuation/adult school.

Schools

High School

 Selma High

Middle School

 Abraham Lincoln Middle School

Elementary Schools

 Eric White Elementary
 Garfield Elementary
 Indianola Elementary
 Jackson Elementary
 Roosevelt Elementary
 Terry Elementary
 Washington Elementary
 Wilson Elementary

Continuation/Adult school

 Heartland Alternative School/Selma Adult ISP

References

School districts established in 1877
School districts in Fresno County, California
1877 establishments in California

Garfield elementary